Heliothis australis is a species of moth of the family Noctuidae. It is found from Chiapas in southern Mexico northward to New Mexico and Arizona.

Adults are on from May to October.

External links
A Review Of The Phloxiphaga Group Of Thegenus Heliothis (Noctuidae: Heliothentinae*)With Description Of A New Species

Heliothis
Moths described in 1994